Karjatse meri is a lake in Estonia.

See also
List of lakes of Estonia

Lakes of Estonia
Lääne-Nigula Parish
Landforms of Lääne County